The northern Tiraumea River is a river of the Manawatū-Whanganui region of New Zealand's North Island. The river rises in the rough hill country of the Tararua District, just south of the settlement of Tiraumea. A tributary, Tiraumea Stream, drains the southern end of the Puketoi Range.

References

Rivers of Manawatū-Whanganui
Tararua District
Rivers of New Zealand